Holar can refer to:

 Hólar, a small community in Iceland
 Holar, Kashmir, a town in Azad Kashmir
 Holar (people), India